Philippe Torreton (born 13 October 1965) is a French actor.

Life and career
Born in Rouen, to a teacher mother, and filling station attendant father, Torreton grew up in a suburb of the city. A student at the lycée Val de Seine de Grand-Quevilly, he discovered there a certain liking for the theater that he nurtured, thanks to his teachers, - he often cites one in particular, - M.Désir. A student of CNSAD, he would return there, this time as a teacher, in October 2008.

Torreton entered the Comédie-Française in 1990 as a pensionnaire (salaried actor having no share in the profits) and  became a sociétaire (shareholding member of the Comédie-Française) in 1994. He left in 1999 having played many prestigious roles including Scapin, Lorenzaccio, Hamlet, Henry V, Tartuffe.

He played Capitaine Conan in the film of the same name, directed by  Bertrand Tavernier, based on a little-known incident from the time of the First World War, and for which he won the César Award for Best Actor 1997. And, a politically committed actor, he played the role of the principal of a primary school confronted with social problems in Ça commence aujourd'hui, again directed by Tavernier, in 1998.

He was elected in the Municipal council of the 9th arrondissement of Paris.

On 10 April 2020, during the coronavirus lockdown, Torreton was one of a handful of people to take part in a Good Friday service led by Michel Aupetit, Archbishop of Paris, in the Cathedral of Notre-Dame de Paris, still being rebuilt after the fire a year earlier. All wore protective clothing. During the service, Torreton read Francis Jammes' "Je vous salue, Marie".

Selected filmography

Decorations 
 Officer of the Order of Arts and Letters (2016)

References

External links

 
 

Living people
1965 births
Actors from Rouen
French male film actors
Sociétaires of the Comédie-Française
Conservatoire de Paris alumni
French male stage actors
French National Academy of Dramatic Arts alumni
20th-century French male actors
21st-century French male actors
Best Actor Lumières Award winners
Officiers of the Ordre des Arts et des Lettres